Canonized  Islamic scripture are texts which Muslims believe were revealed by God through various prophets throughout humanity's history—specifically the Quran and Hadith. Muslims believe the Quran to be the final revelation of God to mankind, and a completion and confirmation of previous scriptures. It was believed to have been  revealed to the Islamic prophet Muhammad from 620 CE to 632 CE, and canonized in an official, unified text during the caliphate of Rashidun Uthman, around 650 CE. 

Other Islamic holy books considered by Muslims to be revealed by God before the Quran, mentioned by name in the Quran are the Tawrat (Torah) revealed to the prophets and messengers amongst the Children of Israel, the Zabur (Psalms) revealed to Dawud (David) and the Injil (the Gospel) revealed to Isa (Jesus). The Quran also mentions God revealing the Scrolls of Abraham and the Scrolls of Moses.

Most self-professed Muslims also consider the hadith (words, actions, and silent approvals attributed to Muhammad) to be divine revelation. In their view, they are important because they give detailed direction to Muslims on far more issues than does the Quran so that most of the rules of Sharia are derived from hadith, rather than the Quran. Hadiths however are not universally accepted by Muslims; many claim that most hadiths are fabrications (pseudepigrapha) created in the 8th and 9th century AD, and which are falsely attributed to Muhammad. Not only were the hadith collections compiled centuries after the Quran, but their canonization also came much later. The two "most famous" collections of hadith -- sahihayn of al-Bukhari and Muslim al-Qushayri—began to be accepted as authentic by the Malikis and Hanbali school of fiqh in the mid-5th AH/11th CE century. While hadith are considered divine revelation, the collections of them do not have the same status as copies of the Quran.

Quran

Uthman ibn Affan and the canonization of the Quran
The Quran was canonized only after Muhammad's death in 632 CE. According to Islamic tradition the third caliph, Uthman ibn Affan (r. 23/644–35 AH/655 CE) established the canonical Qur'an, reportedly starting the process in 644 CE, and completing the work around 650 CE (the exact date was not recorded by early Arab annalists).  It is generally accepted that the Uthmanic text comprises all 114 surahs (chapters of the Quran) in the order known today.

The Qur'anic canon is the form of the Quran as recited and written in which it is religiously binding for the Muslim community. This canonical corpus is closed and fixed in the sense that nothing in the Quran can be changed or modified.

According to the traditional Islamic narrative, by the time of Uthman's caliphate, there was a perceived need for clarification of Qur'an reading. The holy book had often been spread to others orally by Muslims who had memorized the Quran in its entirety (huffaz), but now "sharp divergence" had appeared in recitation of the book among Muslims. It is believed the general Hudhayfah ibn al-Yaman reported this problem to the caliph and asked him to establish a unified text. According to the history of al-Tabari, during the expedition to conquer Armenia and Azerbaijan there were 10,000 Kufan Muslim warriors, 6,000 in Azerbaijan and 4,000 at Rayy, and a large number of these soldiers disagreed about the correct way of reciting the Quran.

What was more, many of the huffaz were dying. 70 had been killed in the Battle of Yamama. 
The Islamic empire  had also grown considerably, expanding into Iraq, Syria, Egypt, and Iran, bringing into Islam's fold many new converts from various cultures with varying degrees of isolation. These converts spoke a variety of languages but were not well learned in Arabic, and so Uthman felt it was important to standardize the written text of the Quran on one specific Arabic dialect.

Uthman obtained written "sheets" or parts of the Quran from Ḥafṣa, one of the widows of Muhammad. Other parts collected from Companions had been "written down on parchment, stone, palm leaves and the shoulder blades of camels". He appointed a commission consisting of a scribe of Muhammad, Zayd ibn Thabit and three prominent Meccans, and instructed them to copy the sheets into several volumes based on the dialect of the Quraysh — the tribe of Muhammad and the main tribe of Mecca.

Uthman's reaction in 653 is recorded in the following hadith from :
"So Uthman sent a message to Hafsa saying, "Send us the manuscripts of the Quran so that we may compile the Quranic materials in perfect copies and return the manuscripts to you." Hafsa sent it to Uthman. Uthman then ordered Zaid bin Thabit, Abdullah bin Az Zubair, Said bin Al-As and Abdur Rahman bin Harith bin Hisham to rewrite the manuscripts in perfect copies. Uthman said to the three Quraishi men, "In case you disagree with Zaid bin Thabit on any point in the Quran, then write it in the dialect of Quraish, the Quran was revealed in their tongue." They did so, and when they had written many copies, 'Uthman returned the original manuscripts to Hafsa. 'Uthman sent to every Muslim province one copy of what they had copied and ordered that all the other Quranic materials, whether written in fragmentary manuscripts or whole copies, be burnt. Zayd bin Thabit added, "A Verse from Surat Ahzab was missed by me when we copied the Quran and I used to hear Allah's Apostle reciting it. So we searched for it and found it with Khuzaima bin Thabit Al-Ansari. [That verse was]: 'Among the Believers are men who have been true in their covenant with Allah.'"

When the task was finished Uthman kept one copy in Medina and sent others to Kufa, Baṣra, Damascus, and, according to some accounts, Mecca, and ordered that all other variant copies of the Quran be destroyed. Some non-Uthmanic Qurans are thought to have survived in Kufa, where Abdullah ibn Masud and his followers reportedly refused.

This is one of the most contested issues and an area where many non-Muslim and Muslim scholars often clash.

Variants of the Quran
According to Islamic tradition the Quran was revealed to Muhammad in seven ahruf (translated variously as "styles", "forms", or "modes", singular harf). However,  Uthman canonized only one of the harf (according to tradition). According to Islamic tradition, the other ahruf were destroyed because after Muhammad's death a rivalry began to develop among some of the Arab tribes over the alleged superiority of their ahruf. In addition, some new converts to Islam began mixing the various forms of recitation out of ignorance. Consequently, as part of the canonization of the Quran, caliph Uthman ordered the rest of the ahruf to be destroyed.

This does not mean that only one "reading" of the Quran is canonized. The single harf canonized by Uthman did not include vowels or diacritical marks for some consonants, which allowed for variant readings. Seven readings—known as Qira'at—were noted by scholar Abu Bakr Ibn Mujāhid and canonized in the 8th century CE. Later scholars, such as Ibn al-Jazari, added three other reciters (Abu Ja’far from Madinah, Ya’qub from Basrah, and Khalaf from Kufa) to form the canonical list of ten Qira'at.

Of the ten, the one qira'at has become so popular that (according to one source) "for all practical purposes", it is the one Quranic version in "general use" in the Muslim world today -- Hafs ‘an ‘Asim, specifically the standard Egyptian edition of the Qur’an first published on July 10, 1924 in Cairo.  Mass-produced printing press mus'haf (written copies of the Quran) have been credited with narrowing the diversity of qira'at.

Shia belief
Something like 15% of Muslims are part of the Shī‘ah (also Shia) branch of Islam. 
Shia Islam holds that instead of Islam being led by a caliphate of caliphs chosen from the Companions of the Prophet after the death of Muhammad, that Sunni believe in, Muhammad designated his nephew and son-in-law Ali ibn Abi Talib as his successor and the first Imam (leader) of Islam.   
While Shia use the same Qur'an as Sunni Muslims, they have a different story of its canonization, connected to the initial rift between the two groups, i.e. that the  Companions of the Prophet (allegedly) unjustly denied Ali this leadership position.  Most Shī‘ah believe the Qur'an was gathered and compiled not by Uthman ibn Affan (one of The Companions) but by Muhammad himself during his lifetime.

According to influential Shia Marja' Abu al-Qasim al-Khoei, Uthman's collection of the Quran was metaphorical, not physical,. Rather than collecting the verses and surahs in one volume (Al-Khoei argues), Uthman united Muslims on the reading of one authoritative recension — the one in circulation among most Muslims, having reached them through uninterrupted transmission from Muhammad.    
According to the Shia website Al-Islam,  a minority of Shia believe the Quran was compiled by Ali, "after the Prophet’s death but before people finally accepted him as a caliph".

While some Shia Muslims disputed the canonical validity of the Uthmanic codex, the majority do not and  believe that the text is identical.  the Shia Imams always rejected the idea of alteration of Qur'an's text. Only seven Shia scholars have believed in omissions in the Uthmanic codex.

However, the story of the canonization of the Quran is of importance in Islam for a number of reasons.

Since at least the 10th century anti-Shia Sunni Muslims have accused Shia of claiming that the contemporary Quran differs from what was revealed to Muhammad; of believing that the original Quran was edited to remove any references to (among other things) the rights of Ali and the Imams (descendants of Ali that should be accepted as leaders and guides of the Muslim community).  The idea that the Quran was distorted is regard by these Sunnis as an outrageous Shia "heresy".

Twelver Shia (the overwhelming majority of Shia are Twelver Shia) did at one time believe in the distortion of the Quran, according to western Islamic scholar Etan Kohlberg — and the belief was common among Shia during the early Islamic centuries, 
but waned during the era of the Buyid dynasty (934–1062).  Kohlberg claims that Ibn Babawayh was the first major Twelver author "to adopt a position identical to that of the Sunnis". This change in belief was primarily a result of the Shia "rise to power at the centre of the Sunni 'Abbasid caliphate," whence belief in the corruption of the Quran became untenable vis-a-vis the position of Sunni “orthodoxy”.

The Brill Encyclopedia of the Quran also states some Shia Muslims have disputed the canonical validity of the Uthmanic codex, And according to Hossein Modarressi, seven early Shia scholars believed there are omissions in the Uthmanic codex.

Previous revelations

Other Islamic holy books considered by Muslims to be revealed by God before the Quran, mentioned by name in the Quran are the Tawrat (Torah), the Zabur (Psalms) revealed to Dawud (David) and the Injil (the Gospel) revealed to Isa (Jesus). The Quran also mentions God revealing the Scrolls of Abraham and the Scrolls of Moses.

Hadith

Second only to the Quran in authority as a source for religious law and moral guidance for most self-professed Muslims, are hadith—the record of what Muslims believe to be the words, actions, and the silent approval of Muhammad. While the number of verses pertaining to law in the Quran is relatively few, hadith are considered by many to give direction on everything from details of religious obligations (such as Ghusl or Wudu, ablutions for salat prayer), to the correct forms of salutations and the importance of benevolence to slaves. Thus the "great bulk" of the rules of Sharia are derived from hadith, rather than the Quran.) Most Muslims believe that the scriptural authority for hadith comes from the Quran which enjoins Muslims to emulate Muhammad and obey his judgments (in verses such as). Other Muslims do not believe these verses are related to hadiths, which they regard as fabrications (pseudepigrapha) created in the 8th and 9th century AD, and which are falsely attributed to Muhammad.

Because there were a large number of false hadith, a great deal of effort was expended by scholars in a field known as hadith studies to sift through and grade hadith on a scale of authenticity. In Sunni Islam there are six major authentic hadith collections known as the Kutub al-Sittah (six books) or al-Sihah al-Sittah (the authentic six). 
The two "most famous" 'Authentic' (Sahih) ḥadīth collections are those of Sahih al-Bukhari and Sahih Muslim — known as the sahihayn (two sahih). These works came out over two centuries after the Uthmanic codex, (the hadith collections do not have original publishing dates but the authors' death dates range from 870 to 915 CE).

Because the Kutub al-Sittah hadith collections used by Sunni Muslims were based on  narrators and transmitters that Shia Islam believed treated Ali unfairly and so were not trustworthy, Shia follow different hadith collections. The most famous being  "The Four Books", which were compiled by three authors who are known as the 'Three Muhammads'. The Four Books are: Kitab al-Kafi by Muhammad ibn Ya'qub al-Kulayni al-Razi (329 AH), Man la yahduruhu al-Faqih by Muhammad ibn Babuya and Al-Tahdhib and Al-Istibsar both by Shaykh Muhammad Tusi. Shi'a clerics also make use of extensive collections and commentaries by later authors.

Not only were the hadith collections compiled centuries after the Quran, but their canonization also came much later. Scholar Jonathan A. C. Brown has studied the process of canonization of the two "most famous" collections of hadith -- sahihayn of al-Bukhari and Muslim—which went from "controversial to indispensable" over the centuries.  
From their very creation, they were subject to withering criticism and rejection: Muslim was forced to argue that his book was merely meant as a 'private collection' (94) and al-Bukhari was accused of plagiarism (95). The 4th/10th and 5th/11th centuries were no kinder, for while the Shafi'is [school of fiqh law] championed the Sahihayn, Malikis were initially enamored of their own texts and 'tangential to the Sahihayn network" (37), while the Hanbalis were openly critical. Not until the mid-5th/11th century did these schools come to a tacit agreement on the status of 'the Sahihayn canon as a measure of authenticity in polemics and exposition of their schools' doctrines' (222); it would be three more centuries before the Hanafis would join them in this assessment.

Brown writes that the books achieved iconic status in the Sunni Muslim community such that public readings of them were made in Cairo in 790 AH/1388 CE to ward off plague and the Moroccan statesman Mawlay Isma'il (d.1727) "dubbed his special troops the 'slaves of al-Bukhari'".

See also 

 List of Islamic texts
 List of Shia books
 Prophets and messengers in Islam
 Sunnah

Notes

References

Citations

Sources 

 

Islamic theology
Islamic texts